Campaign finance reform may refer to:
 Reform of campaign finance policies
 Campaign finance reform in the United States